DWGO may refer to:
 DWGO-AM, an AM radio station broadcasting in Olongapo, Luzon, Philippines
 DWGO-FM, an FM radio station broadcasting in Legazpi, Albay, Philippines, branded as One FM